Luis Fernando Lucumí Villegas (born 2 February 1998) is a Colombian Paralympic athlete with cerebral palsy. He represented Colombia at the 2016 Summer Paralympics in Rio de Janeiro, Brazil and he won the silver medal in the men's javelin throw F38 event. He won the bronze medal in the men's javelin throw F38 event at the 2020 Summer Paralympics in Tokyo, Japan.

Career 

At the 2016 Summer Paralympics in Rio de Janeiro, Brazil, he also competed in the men's 100 metres T38 event without winning a medal.

In 2019, he qualified to represent Colombia at the 2020 Summer Paralympics after finishing in 4th place in the men's javelin throw F38 event at the 2019 World Para Athletics Championships held in Dubai, United Arab Emirates.

Achievements

References

External links 
 

Living people
1998 births
Place of birth missing (living people)
Colombian male javelin throwers
Colombian male shot putters
Colombian male sprinters
Track and field athletes with cerebral palsy
Athletes (track and field) at the 2016 Summer Paralympics
Athletes (track and field) at the 2020 Summer Paralympics
Medalists at the 2016 Summer Paralympics
Medalists at the 2020 Summer Paralympics
Paralympic silver medalists for Colombia
Paralympic bronze medalists for Colombia
Paralympic medalists in athletics (track and field)
Paralympic athletes of Colombia
21st-century Colombian people